Portrait of an Elderly Man or Portrait of an Old Nobleman (Spanish - Retrato de caballero anciano) is a 1597-1600 oil on canvas portrait by El Greco, now in the Prado Museum. Its subject's name is unknown but he probably came from Toledo, where the artist was then working.
 It was stored in the basement of the Real Alcázar of Madrid.

References

Elderly Man
Elderly Man
16th-century portraits
1590s paintings
Paintings by El Greco in the Museo del Prado